The U.S. state of Idaho first required its residents to register their motor vehicles and display license plates in 1913. , plates are issued by the Idaho Transportation Department through its Division of Motor Vehicles. Front and rear plates are required for most classes of vehicles, while only rear plates are required for motorcycles and trailers.

Passenger baseplates

1913 to 1967
The 1956 (dated 1957) issue was the first Idaho license plate that fully complied with these standards: the issues from 1952 through 1955 (dated 1953 through 1956) were all 6 inches in height by 12 inches in width, but had non-standard mounting holes.

1968 to present

County coding
The current county-coding system on standard-issue Idaho license plates has been in use since 1945. The naming convention is the order of the county in an alphabetical list followed by the first letter of the county name. For example, 2T indicates the second county beginning with T in an alphabetical list, or Twin Falls County. If only one county begins with a particular letter, the letter alone serves as the county code. Specialty and vanity license plates do not use county codes; some non-passenger types are county-coded, while others are not.

Non-passenger types

Government types

Optional plates

Discontinued

References

External links

 Idaho Motor Vehicle County Office Locations
 Idaho license plates, 1969–present

 
 Vehicle
Idaho
Transportation in Idaho
Idaho transportation-related lists